"Do Ya"/"Stay with Me" is McFly's third single taken from the album Radio:Active and was the official Children in Need single for 2008. It was released for download on 23 November 2008 and physically on 24 November 2008. "Stay with Me" is a cover of a song by The Faces, and was the main Children in Need single. McFly performed both tracks live on Children in Need 2008 on 14 November 2008. "Do Ya" appears on the international soundtrack to the Brazilian telenovela, Três Irmãs.

Chart performance
On 30 November 2008, the single debuted on the UK Singles Chart at number 18 after both physical and digital releases of the song was made available. This marked the first time McFly had ever missed the UK top 10. Previously, their lowest-charting single had been "Ultraviolet/The Ballad of Paul K", which peaked at number nine, their first not to reach the top five. The single stayed in the UK top 100 for only two weeks. It was also the lowest-charting Children In Need charity single since "Perfect Day" topped the chart in 1997, until the 2011 cover of "Teardrop" peaked lower at number 24.

Music video
The video for "Do Ya" is approximately four minutes long, and was released via their YouTube account and their Myspace page. The video begins in a house, where people gather for Christmas, and start opening their presents, which had a McFly member in it. As soon as the band comes out of the boxes, they begin to play the song. More guests arrive, and soon, Zombies arrive at the house. McFly were scared out at the end of the song, and exited via their van and off to the moon.

The video for "Do Ya", along with the Christmas Radio:ACTIVE album advert that was recorded at the same time, were controversially refused airplay for being 'too scary' and for the fear of being copied by young viewers (when the McFly members were inside Christmas presents). Eventually, though, it earned airplay on TMF Most Wanted.

Track listing

Charts

Release history

References

2008 singles
McFly songs
Children in Need singles
Songs written by Tom Fletcher
Songs written by Dougie Poynter
Songs written by Danny Jones
Songs written by James Bourne